Horná Orava Protected Landscape Area is one of the 14 protected landscape areas in Slovakia. It is situated in the Námestovo and Tvrdošín districts, within the Orava region.

History
The park was created on 24 September 1979 and the law creating it was amended on 29 September 2003.

Geography, geology and biology
It is made of Oravská Magura, Podbeskydská vrchovina and Oravské Beskydy mountains, and the Orava Basin, as well as the Orava Dam, in the northernmost Slovakia.
Much of the PLA's territory is made from sandstone mountain ranges. More than half of the area is covered by forests. Beech and fir trees grow in the area, along with strong presence of the spruce monoculture. Exceptions are the areas under Babia hora, Paráč and Pilsko mountains, with old growth spruce with rowan trees being represented. A specific phenomenon of the park are the peat bogs, represented by the pine woods, providing shelter for many threatened species. The Orava Dam is a nesting place for many rare species of birds. The highest mountain is Babia hora at the border with Poland at

External links
Horná Orava PLA at Slovakia.travel
Description of the Horná Orava PLA at The Slovak State Nature Conservancy 

Protected areas of Slovakia
Protected areas established in 1979
Protected areas of the Western Carpathians
Geography of Žilina Region
Tourist attractions in Žilina Region